Assyrians in Greece include migrants of Assyrian descent living in Greece. The number of Assyrians in Greece is estimated at around 6,000 people.

History and distribution
The modern history of the Assyrians in Greece dates back to the 1920s when a number of Assyrians who were settled in Greece formed the Assyrian Federation of Greece to represent their community. This organisation was officially recognised by the Greek state in 1934.

More Assyrian refugees later arrived from Turkey, Iran, Iraq and Syria due to instability in those countries and using Greece as an immigration bridge to western and northern European countries, like Germany and Sweden, where it is possible to get easier access to asylum and social benefits. Currently there are more than 6,000 Assyrians in Greece, around 1,000 of them are naturalised while most of the rest live in limbo with no permit. The ethnic Assyrians are mostly concentrated in suburbs of Athens, mainly in the Egaleo and Kalamaki.

See also
 Assyrians in Germany
 Assyrians in Sweden
 Assyrian diaspora

Notes 

Assyrians
Greece
Assyrian ethnic groups
Middle Eastern diaspora in Greece